Bela lirifera is a species of sea snail, a marine gastropod mollusk in the family Mangeliidae.

This species is considered a taxon inquirendum

Description

Distribution
Fossil specimens were found in Pleistocene strata in Italy. Recent specimens were found in the Adriatic Sea and in the Aegean Sea.

References

  Della Bella G., Naldi F. & Scarponi D. (2015). Molluschi marini del Plio-Pleistocene dell'Emilia-Romagna e della Toscana - Superfamiglia Conoidea, vol. 4, Mangeliidae II. Lavori della Società Italiana di Malacologia. 26: 1-80

External links

lirifera